John Beveridge may refer to:
 John Lourie Beveridge (1824–1910), governor of Illinois
 John Beveridge (cricketer) (1909–1971), South African cricketer
 John Beveridge (mayor) (1848–1916), New South Wales businessman and mayor
 John Beveridge (rower) (1936–2016), English rower
 Jack Beveridge (1907–1986), Australian rules footballer